Don Lattin is an American journalist and the author of six published books, including The Harvard Psychedelic Club (HarperCollins 2010) and Changing Our Minds — Psychedelic Sacraments and the New Psychotherapy (Synergetic Press, 2017)  Lattin’s work has appeared in many U.S. magazines and newspapers, including the San Francisco Chronicle where he worked for two decades as a staff writer covering religion, spirituality and psychology.

Lattin taught as an adjunct faculty member at the Graduate School of Journalism at the University of California at Berkeley, where he holds a degree in sociology.

Books 
 In Shopping For Faith, Lattin and co-author Richard Cimino aim to expose how the United States shopping mall and consumer-obsessed culture influences religious choices throughout the country. Lattin and Cimino attempt to predict religion’s role in the new millennium.
 Lattin’s Following Our Bliss interprets the American spiritual and religious landscape since the 1960s. Following Our Bliss argues that the 1960s has had a profound transformative impact in every area of spirituality. This is the first comprehensive look at the spiritual legacy of the 1960s and 1970s as seen through the lives of those raised amid some of the era’s wildest experimentation.
 In Jesus Freaks, Lattin tells the story of a January 2005 murder/suicide that sheds new light on the Children of God/Family International, one of the most controversial religious movements to emerge from the spiritual turmoil of the 1960s and 1970s. It is the story of Ricky “Davidito” Rodriguez, a child born into the inner sanctum of the Children of God, a cult that sent thousands on a long, strange trip into the messianic fantasy of leader David “Moses” Berg and spawned a second generation that still struggles with that legacy.
The Harvard Psychedelic Club: How Timothy Leary, Ram Dass, Huston Smith, and Andrew Weil Killed the Fifties and Ushered in a New Age for America traces the efforts of four notable players who brought LSD to the attention of the world: Leary, Richard Alpert (later Ram Dass), Smith, and Weil. They were involved with the experimentation with, and research of, psychedelic drugs in the early 1960s. Leary and Alpert were professors at Harvard starting research on the drugs as having possible benefits for alcoholics and criminals. At the suggestion of Aldous Huxley, religious scholar Huston Smith was brought in to advise about the possible link to mystical experiences. Andrew Weil was a student at the time and journalist for the Harvard paper - and ultimately exposed the unorthodox drug use to University authorities, resulting in Leary and Alpert leaving Harvard.

Bibliography

Books 

 Jesus Freaks – A True Story of Murder and Madness on the Evangelical Edge (HarperOne 2007)
 Distilled Spirits (2012)
 The Harvard Psychedelic Club (HarperOne 2010)
 Shopping for Faith – American Religion in the New Millennium (Co-author with Richard Cimino,  Jossey Bass, 1998)

Articles

References

External links 
 Don Lattin's official website
 Beliefnet Article by Don Lattin
 Don Lattin's HarperCollins author biography
 Don Lattin discusses The Harvard Psychedelic Club Interview on the 7th Avenue Project radio show

American male writers
Living people
Year of birth missing (living people)